Qukh or Qowkh may refer to:
 Qukh, Kermanshah
 Qukh, Saqqez, Kurdistan Province